Heidelberg is an electoral constituency (German: Wahlkreis) represented in the Bundestag. It elects one member via first-past-the-post voting. Under the current constituency numbering system, it is designated as constituency 274. It is located in northwestern Baden-Württemberg, comprising the city of Heidelberg and the northern part of the Rhein-Neckar-Kreis district.

Heidelberg was created for the inaugural 1949 federal election. Since 2021, it has been represented by Franziska Brantner of the Alliance 90/The Greens.

Geography
Heidelberg is located in northwestern Baden-Württemberg. As of the 2021 federal election, it comprises the independent city of Heidelberg and the municipalities of Dossenheim, Edingen-Neckarhausen, Eppelheim, Heddesheim, Hemsbach, Hirschberg an der Bergstraße, Ilvesheim, Ladenburg, Laudenbach, Schriesheim, and Weinheim from the Rhein-Neckar-Kreis district.

History
Heidelberg was created in 1949. In the 1965 through 1976 elections, it was named Heidelberg-Stadt. In the 1949 election, it was Württemberg-Baden Landesbezirk Baden constituency 3 in the number system. In the 1953 through 1961 elections, it was number 177. In the 1965 through 1976 elections, it was number 181. In the 1980 through 1998 elections, it was number 178. In the 2002 and 2005 elections, it was number 275. Since the 2009 election, it has been number 274.

Originally, the constituency comprised the independent city of Heidelberg and the Landkreis Heidelberg district. In the 1965 through 1972 elections, it comprised the city of Heidelberg, the Eppelheim municipality from the Landkreis Heidelberg district, and the municipalities of Altlußheim, Brühl, Hockenheim, Ketsch, Neulußheim, Oftersheim, Plankstadt, Reilingen, and Schwetzingen from the Landkreis Mannheim district. In the 1976 through 1998 elections, its borders did not change, but its area from the Landkreis Mannheim and Landkreis Heidelberg districts became part of the Rhein-Neckar-Kreis district. It acquired its current borders in the 2002 election.

Members
The constituency was first represented by Eduard Wahl of the Christian Democratic Union (CDU) from 1949 to 1969. It was won by Alex Möller of the Social Democratic Party (SPD) in 1969, who served until 1976. Karl Weber of the CDU was elected in 1976, and served one term. Hartmut Soell regained it for the SPD in 1980. Udo Ehrbar of the CDU was representative from 1983 to 1994. Karl A. Lamers of the CDU was elected in 1994 and served one term. Lothar Binding of the SPD was elected in 1998 and re-elected in 2002. Former member Lamers regained the constituency in 2005 and served as representative until 2021. Franziska Brantner won it for the Greens in 2021.

Election results

2021 election

2017 election

2013 election

2009 election

References

Federal electoral districts in Baden-Württemberg
1949 establishments in West Germany
Constituencies established in 1949
Heidelberg
Rhein-Neckar-Kreis